Sueca Ricers is an American football team based in Sueca, Spain.

External links
Official website

American football teams established in 2007
2007 establishments in Spain
American football teams in Spain
Sports teams in the Valencian Community